Eddie Bailham (8 May 1941 in Dublin – 18 December 2016) was an Irish football player.

After an apprenticeship at Manchester United the same time as Johnny Giles he returned home to play for Home Farm F.C. In August 1959 he signed for Cork Hibernians.

He joined Shamrock Rovers F.C. in 1960 and as a striker was top scorer in the League of Ireland on two occasions, 1961–62 and 1963-64. On 20 August 1962 Bailham scored his only headed goal for the Hoops in a 5-5 draw against Drumcondra F.C. In February 1963 he scored four times as Rovers hammered Bohemian F.C. 7-1 at Glenmalure Park. In August 1963 he scored a hat trick of penalties in a 4-1 win over Limerick F.C.

Played 5 times in European competition for the Milltown club. Scored 49 league and 12 FAI Cup goals in the Hoops.

Eddie had a "glorious representative debut" scoring for the League of Ireland XI in the 2-1 defeat of an English League XI in October 1963  He scored 4 goals in 4 total Inter-League appearances between 1962 and 1964.

He won his one and only senior cap for the Republic of Ireland on 24 May 1964 in a 3-1 defeat to England at Dalymount Park.

Scored a hat-trick in his last game for the Hoops on 27 September 1964.

Emigrated to London shortly after but as he was still technically a Shamrock Rovers player he could not sign for an English league team. So he joined Cambridge City F.C. and also had spells at Worcester F.C. and Wimbledon F.C.  He was the Southern League Premier Division top scorer in 1965-66 with 37 goals.

He died in December 2016.

Honours
League of Ireland
 Shamrock Rovers - 1964
FAI Cup: 2
 Shamrock Rovers - 1962, 1964
League of Ireland Shield
 Shamrock Rovers - 1964
Leinster Senior Cup (football)
 Shamrock Rovers - 1963/64
Dublin City Cup
 Shamrock Rovers - 1963/64

Sources 
 The Hoops by Paul Doolan and Robert Goggins

References

Association footballers from County Dublin
Republic of Ireland association footballers
Republic of Ireland international footballers
Home Farm F.C. players
Shamrock Rovers F.C. players
Cambridge City F.C. players
Worcester City F.C. players
Wimbledon F.C. players
League of Ireland players
1941 births
2016 deaths
Cork Hibernians F.C. players
League of Ireland XI players
Manchester United F.C. players
Association football forwards